No Pity for Women (French: Pas de pitié pour les femmes) is a 1950 French mystery film directed by Christian Stengel and starring Simone Renant, Michel Auclair and Marcel Herrand. It was adapted by Jean Giltène from his own novel. The film's art direction was by Robert Hubert.

Cast
 Simone Renant as Marianne Séverin  
 Michel Auclair as Michel Dunan - le sosie d'Alain / Alain de Norbois - le riche disparu  
 Marcel Herrand as Norbert - le majordome  
 René Blancard as Me Tirgen, l'avocat  
 André Versini as Adrien  
 Guy Favières as Guillaume  
 René Hell as Un joueur de bonneteau  
 Roger Bontemps as Un inspecteur 
 Paul Delon as L'inspecteur général Leroux  
 Jean-Jacques Duverger as Paul de Norbois  
 Robert Vattier as Adolphe Mercier - un homme d'affaires  
 Jacques Castelot as Le juge d'instruction  
 Geneviève Page as Carole de Norbois 
 Teddy Bilis
 Nicole Gamma 
 Reine Charmy
 Marcelle Arnold
 Jean Brunel
 Paule Launay
 Marcel Rouzé
 René Sauvaire

References

Bibliography 
 Rège, Philippe. Encyclopedia of French Film Directors, Volume 1. Scarecrow Press, 2009.

External links 
 

1950 films
1950s mystery films
French mystery films
1950s French-language films
Films directed by Christian Stengel
French black-and-white films
1950s French films